The Legend of Nayuta: Boundless Trails, known as  in Japan, is a 2012 action role-playing game developed by Nihon Falcom. The game is a part of the Trails series, itself a part of the larger The Legend of Heroes series. It was first released in Japan for PlayStation Portable. A high-definition remaster was released in Japan for PlayStation 4 and Windows in 2021 and for Nintendo Switch in 2022. This version is also scheduled for a worldwide release by NIS America in late 2023.

Gameplay
The Legend of Nayuta: Boundless Trails is an action role-playing game, with gameplay similar to Falcom's Ys series and Zwei: The Ilvard Insurrection. Combat actions include physical attacks, magical attacks known as Arts, and powerful abilities unique to each character known as Crafts. The game also features elements of platforming.

Plot
The Legend of Nayuta: Boundless Trails is set in two worlds: the main characters' home world, and a mysterious world called Lost Heaven. The main characters' hometown is Remnant Island, located in the center of Sciencia Sea, a vast ocean with countless islands. Shooting stars have been continually falling from the sky for some time, leaving much of these piled up on the island. Stones known as "Star Fragments" have been discovered in these areas. By shining a light on them in a certain way, people can see the phantom world of Lost Heaven.

The story follows Nayuta Herschel, a young aspiring researcher aiming to see what's further beyond the known world, who was just returning to Remnant Island for the summer, when he and his childhood friend Signa Alhazen find themselves in the world of Lost Heaven through the guidance of the otherworldly fairy Noi, as they get involved in a plot to stop a madman and his right-hand man from destroying Lost Heaven and potentially Nayuta's own world in the process.

Release
It was first released as Nayuta no Kiseki for the PlayStation Portable in Japan  on July 26, 2012. A remaster, Nayuta no Kiseki: Kai, was released in Japan for PlayStation 4 on June 24, 2021. Various aspects of the game were improved: all characters received dialogue portraits, the illustrations for key events were remade, the frame rate was increased to 60 per second, and sound was replaced with higher-quality files. It was later released for Windows in Japanese on December 11, with the port handled by PH3 Games and published by NIS America. An English release by NIS America is scheduled for Nintendo Switch, PlayStation 4, and Windows in late 2023.

Another enhanced version, Nayuta no Kiseki: Ad Astra, was released in Japan for Nintendo Switch on May 26, 2022, and features the same improvements as the previous remaster. It was the first Switch game developed in-house by Falcom, with earlier ports of Ys and The Legend of Heroes games being outsourced to other companies.

Notes

References

External links
 

2012 video games
Action role-playing video games
Fantasy video games
Japanese role-playing video games
Nihon Falcom games
Nintendo Switch games
Nippon Ichi Software games
PlayStation 4 games
PlayStation Portable games
Role-playing video games
Single-player video games
The Legend of Heroes
Trails (series)
Video games developed in Japan 
Windows games